San Juan de Plan (in Chistabin: San Chuan de Plan) is a municipality located northeast of Plan in the province of Huesca, Aragon, Spain, in the foothills of the Pyrenees. According to the 2018 census (INE), the municipality has a population of 152 inhabitants.

The Romanesque church of the former abbey of San Juan Bautista, for which the community is named, was enlarged in the sixteenth century. The sixteenth-century abbot's house now houses the ethnographic museum.

References

Municipalities in the Province of Huesca